Bahadarpur is a village in Meerut district of Uttar Pradesh, India. it is approximately 6.5 kilometers from Mawana and 7 kilometers from Prikshitgarh.

The village's population is approximately 5,800 people of which 70% are Punjabi jat And 30% JATAV AREA . The principal crop is sugar cane, as well as wheat, potatoes, peas, cabbage, mustard, and pulses.

There is one primary and  upper primary school in the village and two private schools for 10th class.

There are two temples in the village, |Khichdi wale baba| temple and Shiv Mandir. 
The people's of the village very sweet caring and loving. The 40% people of village are employee in government/Private sector like ( Information Technology , army, police, defense, teacher, engineer).

Villages in Meerut district